Penelope ("Penny") Heyns OIS (born 8 November 1974) is a South African former swimmer, who is best known for being the only woman in the history of the Olympic Games to have won both the 100 m and 200 m breaststroke events – at the 1996 Atlanta Olympic Games – making her South Africa's first post-apartheid Olympic gold medallist following South Africa's re-admission to the Games in 1992. Along with Australian champion Leisel Jones, Heyns is regarded as one of the greatest breaststroke swimmers.

Sporting career 

Heyns was the youngest member of the South African Olympic team at the 1992 Summer Olympics in Barcelona. She was also a member of the South African squad at the 1994 Commonwealth Games, where she won a bronze medal in the 200 m breaststroke event.

Heyns broke her first world record, the 100 m breaststroke, in Durban in March 1996. Heyns was again part of the South African Olympic team in Atlanta in 1996, where she won the gold medal for the 100 m breaststroke (also breaking the world record for the event) as well as the gold medal for the 200 m breaststroke (also breaking the Olympic record for the event). This made her the only woman in the history of the Olympic Games to have won both the 100 m and 200 m breaststroke events. During the 1998 Goodwill Games in New York, Heyns set the 50 m breaststroke world record. In 1999, Heyns set a spate of eleven world records in three months, swimming at events on three different continents. This made her the simultaneous holder of five out of the possible six breaststroke world records, a feat that had never been achieved before in the history of swimming.

Heyns was named by Swimming World magazine as the Female World Swimmer of the Year in 1996 and 1999. She was also a member of the South African Olympic team at the 2000 Olympic Games in Sydney. She won a bronze medal in the 100 m breaststroke.

Heyns retired from competitive swimming in 2001. In 2004 Heyns was an athlete's commission member of the International Swimming Federation (FINA). She is a businesswoman, motivational and public speaker, and television presenter. She has also completed an autobiography.

Heyns was voted 52nd in the Top 100 Great South Africans in 2004.

See also
 List of members of the International Swimming Hall of Fame
 List of Olympic medalists in swimming (women)
 World record progression 50 metres breaststroke

References

External links 
 Penny Heyns Homepage

1974 births
Living people
South African female swimmers
University of Nebraska–Lincoln alumni
Olympic swimmers of South Africa
Olympic gold medalists for South Africa
Swimmers at the 1992 Summer Olympics
Swimmers at the 1996 Summer Olympics
Swimmers at the 2000 Summer Olympics
World record setters in swimming
Olympic bronze medalists in swimming
Medalists at the 1996 Summer Olympics
Medalists at the 2000 Summer Olympics
Female breaststroke swimmers
Medalists at the FINA World Swimming Championships (25 m)
Nebraska Cornhuskers women's swimmers
University of Nebraska alumni
People from Springs, Gauteng
Swimmers at the 1994 Commonwealth Games
Commonwealth Games bronze medallists for South Africa
Olympic bronze medalists for South Africa
Olympic gold medalists in swimming
Commonwealth Games medallists in swimming
African Games gold medalists for South Africa
African Games medalists in swimming
Universiade medalists in swimming
Competitors at the 1995 All-Africa Games
Competitors at the 1999 All-Africa Games
Universiade gold medalists for South Africa
Universiade silver medalists for South Africa
Goodwill Games medalists in swimming
Competitors at the 1997 Summer Universiade
Medalists at the 1995 Summer Universiade
Sportspeople from Gauteng
Competitors at the 1998 Goodwill Games
20th-century South African women
21st-century South African women
Medallists at the 1994 Commonwealth Games